The green-tailed jacamar (Galbula galbula) is a species of bird in the family Galbulidae. It is native to Brazil, Colombia, French Guiana, Guyana, Suriname, and Venezuela.

Taxonomy and systematics

The green-tailed jacamar is monotypic. It and the rufous-tailed (Galbula ruficauda), white-chinned (G. tombacea), bluish-fronted (G. cyanescens), and coppery-chested jacamars (G. pastazae) are considered to form a superspecies.

Description

The male's head, upperparts, and a band across the chest are metallic coppery green, somewhat bluer on the face. The tail is bluish green. The throat is white and the belly and vent area reddish chestnut. The female is similar but the throat is buff and the underparts are duller and paler.

Distribution and habitat

The green-tailed jacamar is found from eastern Colombia's Vichada and Meta Departments east through southern and eastern Venezuela south of the Orinoco River to the Guianas and south in Brazil to the lower Madeira and Tapajós Rivers. It inhabits the borders, but not the interior, of several humid forest types including terra firme, várzea, gallery, and mangrove. It prefers open woodland, savanna, and shrublands, especially along watercourses.

Behavior

Feeding

The green-tailed jacamar's diet is a large variety of insects though Hymenoptera predominate. It perches on exposed branches, often in pairs, and sallies from there to catch its flying prey.

Breeding

The green-tailed jacamar excavates burrows in earth banks or arboreal termite nests. It has been documented breeding February to March in Venezuela, in May, June, and August in Suriname, and in April and September in Brazil.

Vocalization

The green-tailed jacamar's song is an "accelerating 'peeo peeo peea pee-pee-pee-pee-pe-pe-pe-e-e-e-e’e’e’e' that ends in a trill . Its call is a repeated "peep" or "peer", sometimes in a series .

Status

The IUCN has assessed the green-tailed jacamar as being of Least Concern. It appears to be common in most of its range and occurs in several protected areas.

References

External links
Green-tailed jacamar videos on the Internet Bird Collection
Stamps (for Suriname) with RangeMap
Green-tailed jacamar photo gallery VIREO Photo-High Res
Photo-High Res; Article pdubois

green-tailed jacamar
Birds of the Venezuelan Amazon
Birds of the Guianas
green-tailed jacamar
green-tailed jacamar
Taxonomy articles created by Polbot